Villa Lynch  is a locality in Greater Buenos Aires, Argentina. It belongs to the General San Martín Partido in the Province of Buenos Aires.

Parishes of the Catholic Church in Villa Lynch

References 

Populated places in Buenos Aires Province
General San Martín Partido